Georgia Brougham (born 18 March 1996) is an English football defender who last played for Leicester City in the FA Women's Super League.

Club career

Manchester City
Having been brought up in City's youth academy, Brougham made her first team debut in a 3–0 win over Everton in September 2014.  By January 2015, Brougham signed her first professional contract for Manchester City on a two-year deal.

Everton
In February 2016, Brougham signed for Everton of the WSL 2. Brougham would score her first goal for the Blues against Aston Villa during the 2016 season and two more during the championship 2017 Spring Series.

Leicester City
In July 2021, Brougham joined Leicester City on a 5.5 years contract. In January 2023, Brougham mutually terminated her contract with Leicester City.

Honours
Manchester City
Women's League Cup: 2014

References

External links

Everton Profile

Living people
English women's footballers
Manchester City W.F.C. players
Everton F.C. (women) players
Leicester City W.F.C. players
FA Women's National League players
1996 births
Women's association football defenders